Manantali is a town on the Bafing River in the Kayes Region of south-western Mali. East of the town is Lake Manantali and its dam. It is a small town but there is a daily ( morning) market, some shops, a small petrol station and a campsite on the river.

Transport
The town is served by Bengassi Airport.

Populated places in Kayes Region